Comitas kuroharai is a species of sea snail, a marine gastropod mollusc in the family Pseudomelatomidae, the turrids and allies.

Description
The length of the shell attains 82 mm.

Distribution
This marine species occurs in the East China Sea and off Japan.

References

External links
 Biolob.cz: Comitas kuroharai
 
 

kuroharai
Gastropods described in 1962